The When We All Fall Asleep Tour was the fourth concert tour by American singer Billie Eilish, in support of her debut studio album When We All Fall Asleep, Where Do We Go? (2019). The tour began on April 13, 2019, in Indio, California at Empire Polo Club as part of Coachella, and concluded in Mexico City on November 17, 2019, as part of Corona Capital.

Background and development
The tour was announced on February 4, 2019, through Eilish's official Instagram account. In the same post, Eilish announced Denzel Curry would support her as an opening act, while her brother Finneas O'Connell would join her in select Canada stops. The post also blurred international dates. Within days, Australian dates were announced and on February 7, due to overwhelming demand, more dates were added and larger venues were replaced to accommodate larger audiences. Four days later, Eilish announced more international dates on her official Twitter account.

For the first show at Coachella, Eilish had to cut "When I Was Older" and "Xanny" from the setlist due to technical difficulties before the set.

Eilish performed her new single "Everything I Wanted" live for the first time on the tour's final stop in Mexico City.

Set list 
This set list is representative of the show in Dallas, Texas on October 8, 2019. It is not representative of all concerts for the duration of the tour.

"Bad Guy" 
"My Strange Addiction"
"You Should See Me in a Crown"
"Idontwannabeyouanymore"
"Watch" / "&Burn"
"Copycat"
"When I Was Older"
"Wish You Were Gay"
"Xanny"
"All the Good Girls Go to Hell"
"Ilomilo"
"Bellyache"
"Listen Before I Go"
"I Love You"
"Ocean Eyes"
"When the Party's Over"
"Bury a Friend"
"Bad Guy" (reprise) 
"Goodbye"

Shows

Cancelled shows

Accolades

Notes

References

2019 concert tours
Billie Eilish concert tours
Concert tours of North America
Concert tours of Oceania
Concert tours of Europe
Concert tours of the United States
Concert tours of New Zealand
Concert tours of Australia
Concert tours of the United Kingdom
Concert tours of Canada
Concert tours of Denmark
Concert tours of Sweden
Concert tours of Austria
Concert tours of Germany
Concert tours of the Netherlands
Concert tours of Belgium
Concert tours of Switzerland
Concert tours of Russia
Concert tours of Ireland
Concert tours of Italy
Concert tours of Spain
Concert tours of Portugal
Concert tours of Mexico